Kurt Ettinger (19 November 1901 – 6 January 1982) was an Austrian fencer. He competed in the individual and team foil competitions at the 1924 and 1928 Summer Olympics.

References

External links
 

1901 births
1982 deaths
Fencers from Vienna
Austrian male foil fencers
Olympic fencers of Austria
Fencers at the 1924 Summer Olympics
Fencers at the 1928 Summer Olympics